Royal Kids' Convent or Royal Kids' Higher Secondary School is a coeducational 10+2 ICSE board school, situated in the district town Rajnandgaon in the state of Chhattisgarh, India. It is affiliated to the CISCE board in New Delhi.

History
Royal Kids Convent was initially established on 29 June 1984 as a pre- school kindergarten by Mr J.B. Singh and Mr Richard Kerr who recognised the pressing need for regionally based children to have easier local access to nationally accredited education programs, and continuously progressed since then to its present state as a renowned ICSE/CICSE establishment for the last 25 years.

Faciality

The school has a playground, a basketball court, a volleyball court and a badminton court.  There are also indoor games such as table-tennis, carrom and chess.

There are classrooms, also ""Educomp Smart classes"". The school has a library with about 16,000 books, In addition, there are a physics lab, computer lab, biology lab and chemistry lab.

Executive Administrator: Richard Kerr (1984 to 1985)

See also
Education in India
Literacy in India  
List of institutions of higher education in Chhattisgarh
Education in Chhattisgarh

References

External links 
 Royal Kids’ Convent, Rajnandgaon

Schools in Chhattisgarh
Educational institutions established in 1984
Boarding schools in Chhattisgarh
1984 establishments in Madhya Pradesh
Schools in Rajnandgaon